Adjaye is a surname. Notable people with the surname include:

 David Adjaye (born 1966), Ghanaian-British architect
 Ed Asafu-Adjaye (born 1988), English footballer
 Edward Asafu-Adjaye (1903–1976), Ghanaian political figure, lawyer, and diplomat
 James Adjaye (born 1964), Ghanaian-British genetic scientist

Ghanaian surnames